The Ushkan Islands (Russian — Ушканьи острова or Ushkanji Ostrova) are a small archipelago on Lake Baikal in Russia. The group of islands consists of four islands:
 One large island — Big Ushkan Island, 9.5 km² or 3.7 sq mi.
 Three islets: Long Ushkan Islet (1.25 km length), Thin Ushkan Islet (17 m height from Baikal's surface), and Round Ushkan Islet.

The islands are mainly composed of ancient (pre-Cambrian) crystallic limestone, and covered with larch forest. Islands' coastlines are rookery places of Baikal seals.

A part of Transbaikal National Park, the Ushkan Islands are becoming a popular tourist destination. Nevertheless, special permission is required for landing on the islands — such means are imposed to reduce the impact of human activity and to save the natural conditions of the islands.

External links
 Ushkan Islands

Archipelagoes of Russia
Archipelagoes of Asia
Islands of Lake Baikal